Filippo Zana (born 18 March 1999) is an Italian professional racing cyclist, who currently rides for UCI WorldTeam . In August 2020, he rode in the 2020 Il Lombardia in Italy. In October 2020, he was named in the startlist for the 2020 Giro d'Italia.

Major results

2016
 2nd Trofeo Emilio Paganessi
 3rd G.P. Sportivi Sovilla
 6th Road race, UEC European Junior Road Championships
2017
 1st G.P. Sportivi Sovilla
 2nd Trofeo Guido Dorigo
 2nd Trofeo Buffoni
 7th Road race, UCI Junior Road World Championships
2018
 1st Gran Premio Capodarco
 6th GP Kranj
 10th Gran Premio della Liberazione
2019
 2nd Giro del Medio Brenta
 3rd Road race, National Under-23 Road Championships
 3rd Gran Premio Sportivi di Poggiana
 3rd Coppa della Pace
 8th Trofeo Edil C
 10th Overall Giro Ciclistico d'Italia
2020
 10th Memorial Marco Pantani
2021
 1st  Overall Czech Cycling Tour
1st  Points classification
1st  Young rider classification
 1st  Overall Grand Prix Priessnitz spa
1st Stage 2
 2nd Overall Istrian Spring Trophy
1st Stage 2
 3rd Overall Tour de l'Avenir
 5th Overall Adriatica Ionica Race
 6th Road race, UEC European Under-23 Road Championships
2022
 1st  Road race, National Road Championships
 1st  Overall Adriatica Ionica Race
1st  Young rider classification
 4th Overall Czech Cycling Tour
 7th Overall Tour du Limousin
1st  Young rider classification

Grand Tour general classification results timeline

References

External links
 

1999 births
Living people
Italian male cyclists
People from Thiene
Cyclists from the Province of Vicenza